Eupelmus vuilletti is a species of parasitic wasp found in Burkina Faso and Togo. It is a solitary ectoparasite of bruchids.

This wasp is synovigenic. It is also an income breeder in terms of sugars, but a capital breeder in terms of lipids.

References

Eupelmidae
Parasitic wasps